In grammar, a noun adjunct, attributive noun, qualifying noun, noun (pre)modifier, or apposite noun is an optional noun that modifies another noun; functioning similarly to an adjective, it is, more specifically, a noun functioning as a pre-modifier in a noun phrase. For example, in the phrase "chicken soup" the noun adjunct "chicken" modifies the noun "soup". It is irrelevant whether the resulting compound noun is spelled in one or two parts. "Field" is a noun adjunct in both "field player" and "fieldhouse".

Related concepts 
Adjectival noun is a term that was formerly synonymous with noun adjunct but is now usually used to mean "an adjective used as a noun" (i.e. the opposite process, as in the Irish meaning "Irish people" or the poor meaning "poor people"). Japanese adjectival nouns are a different concept.

English 

Noun adjuncts were traditionally mostly singular (e.g. "trouser press") except when there were lexical restrictions (e.g. "arms race"), but there is a recent trend towards more use of plural ones. Many of these can also be or were originally interpreted and spelled as plural possessives (e.g. "chemicals' agency", "writers' conference", "Rangers' hockey game"), but they are now often written without the apostrophe, although decisions on when to do so require editorial judgment.  There are morphologic restrictions on the classes of adjunct that can be plural and nonpossessive; irregular plurals are solecistic as nonpossessive adjuncts (for example, "men clothing" or "women magazine" sound improper to fluent speakers).

Fowler's Modern English Usage states in the section "Possessive Puzzles":

Noun adjuncts can also be strung together in a longer sequence preceding the final noun, with each added noun modifying the noun which follows it, in effect creating a multiple-word noun adjunct which modifies the following noun (e.g. "chicken soup bowl", in which "chicken" modifies "soup" and "chicken soup" modifies "bowl"). There is no theoretical limit to the number of noun adjuncts which can be added before a noun, and very long constructions are occasionally seen, for example "Dawlish pub car park cliff plunge man rescued", in which "pub", "car park", "cliff", and "plunge" are all noun adjuncts. They could each be removed successively (starting at the beginning of the sentence) without changing the grammar of the sentence. This type of construction is not uncommon in headlinese, the condensed grammar used in newspaper headlines.

Use when an adjectivally inflected alternative is available
It is a trait of natural language that there is often more than one way to say something. Any logically valid option will usually find some currency in natural usage. Thus "erythrocyte maturation" and "erythrocytic maturation" can both be heard, the first using a noun adjunct and the second using an adjectival inflection. In some cases one of the equivalent forms has greater idiomaticity; thus  "cell cycle" is more commonly used than "cellular cycle". In some cases, each form tends to adhere to a certain sense; thus "face mask" is the normal term in hockey, and "facial mask" is heard more often in spa treatments. Although "spine cord" is not an idiomatic alternative to "spinal cord", in other cases, the options are arbitrarily interchangeable with negligible idiomatic difference; thus "spine injury" and "spinal injury" coexist and are equivalent from any practical viewpoint, as are "meniscus transplant" and "meniscal transplant". A special case in medical usage is "visual examination" versus "vision examination": the first typically means "an examination made visually", whereas the latter means "an examination of the patient's vision".

Using prepositions after such phrases

"Regulatory impact analysis of the law on business" is probably illogical or at least incomprehensible to all who are not familiar with the term "regulatory impact analysis". Such people understand the preposition "on" as belonging to the expression "law on business" (to which it grammatically belongs) or parse it as an incorrect preposition with "analysis" and do not recognize it as a feeble and grammatically incorrect attempt to refer back to the word "impact". Since the phrase "regulatory impact analysis" is standard in usage, changing it to "analysis of (the) regulatory impact" would look strange to experts even though putting the preposition "on" after it would not cause any problems: "analysis of the regulatory impact of the law on business". A possible solution that does not annoy experts or confuse non-experts is "regulatory impact analysis of the law's effects on business".

Postpositive noun adjuncts
The English language is restrictive in its use of postpositive position for adjectival units (words or phrases), making English use of postpositive adjectives—although not rare—much less common than use of attributive/prepositive position. This restrictive tendency is even stronger regarding noun adjuncts; examples of postpositive noun adjuncts are rare in English, except in certain established uses such as names of lakes or operations, for example Lake Ontario and Operation Desert Storm.

See also
 Adjective
 Attributive verb
 Gerund
 Participle
 Nominalized adjective, an adjective used as a noun
 Apostrophe Protection Society

References

Nouns by type

pt:Termos acessórios da oração#Adjunto adnominal